Chiostri is an Italian surname. Notable people with the surname include:

Carlo Chiostri (1863–1939), Italian painter and graphic artist
Mauro Chiostri (born 1948), Italian sprint canoer 

Italian-language surnames